Jefferson Township is one of nine townships in Sullivan County, Indiana, United States. At the 2010 census, its population was 417 and it contained 234 housing units.

Geography

Unincorporated towns
 Bucktown at 
 Pleasantville at 
(This list is based on USGS data and may include former settlements.)

Adjacent townships
 Cass Township (north)
 Stockton Township, Greene County (northeast)
 Stafford Township, Greene County (east)
 Vigo Township, Knox County (south)
 Widner Township, Knox County (southwest)
 Haddon Township (west)

Cemeteries
The township contains six cemeteries: Hale, McDade, Pirtle, Posey, Smith and Woodward.

Lakes
 Motorboat Lake
 Red Lake
 South Lake
 T Lake
 Twin Lake

School districts
 Northeast School Corporation

References
 United States Census Bureau 2008 TIGER/Line Shapefiles
 United States Board on Geographic Names (GNIS)
 IndianaMap

External links
 Indiana Township Association
 United Township Association of Indiana

Townships in Sullivan County, Indiana
Terre Haute metropolitan area
Townships in Indiana